Homecroft is a town in Perry Township, Marion County, Indiana, United States. The population was 722 at the 2010 census. Incorporated in 1949, it has existed as an included town since 1970, when it was incorporated into Indianapolis as part of Unigov. It is part of Indianapolis, but retains a functioning town government under IC 36-3-1-11.

History
The development's location close to the interurban line in the 1930s and 1940s, and, as the automobile became prominent, to Madison Avenue in the 1950s and 1960s, made it popular for prospective suburban homeowners.

The town was incorporated in 1949.

The town was designed to be exclusively residential, although a few commercial establishments have been built along Madison Avenue. A large portion of the town has been recognized on the National Register of Historic Places as the Homecroft Historic District.

Geography
Homecroft is located at  (39.668945, -86.129862). It is bounded roughly by Banta Road, the Louisville and Indiana Railroad tracks, Tulip Drive and Shelby Street.

Government
The Homecroft town council has five elected members. Besides passing ordinances, resolutions, orders and motions for the town's government, the council also controls the city's property and finances.

The chief of police is appointed by the council. James D. Leonard is the current chief.

Demographics

2010 census
At the 2010 census, there were 722 people, 308 households and 214 families living in the town. The racial make-up of the town was 95.7% White, 0.8% African American, 0.7% Native American, 0.7% Asian, 0.6% from other races and 1.5% from two or more races. Hispanic or Latino of any race were 1.1% of the population.

There were 308 households, of which 28.2% had children under the age of 18 living with them, 55.2% were married couples living together, 11.7% had a female householder with no husband present, 2.6% had a male householder with no wife present and 30.5% were non-families. 26.3% of all households were made up of individuals, and 8.5% had someone living alone who was 65 years of age or older. The average household size was 2.34 and the average family size was 2.82.

The median age was 41.2 years. 21.6% of residents were under the age of 18, 6.4% were between the ages of 18 and 24, 27.2% were from 25 to 44, 32.2% were from 45 to 64 and 12.7% were 65 years of age or older. The sex make-up of the town was 46.7% male and 53.3% female.

2000 census
At of the 2000 census, there were 751 people, 310 households and 227 families living in the town. The racial make-up of the town was 98.67% White, 0.13% African American, 0.40% Asian, 0.27% from other races and 0.53% from two or more races. Hispanic or Latino of any race were 0.80% of the population.

There were 310 households, of which 26.8% had children under the age of 18 living with them, 63.9% were married couples living together, 7.4% had a female householder with no husband present and 26.5% were non-families. 22.6% of all households were made up of individuals, and 8.4% had someone living alone who was 65 years of age or older. The average household size was 2.42 and the average family size was 2.81.

21.8% of the population were under the age of 18, 6.4% from 18 to 24, 29.2% from 25 to 44, 29.0% from 45 to 64 and 13.6% were 65 years of age or older. The median age was 41 years. For every 100 females, there were 101.3 males. For every 100 females age 18 and over, there were 92.5 males.

The median household income was $60,156 and the median family income was $70,859. Males had a median income of $51,563 and females $38,194. The per capita income  was $28,888. About 1.3% of families and 2.1% of the population were below the poverty line, including 1.3% of those under age 18 and none of those age 65 or over.

References

External links

Towns in Marion County, Indiana
Towns in Indiana
Indianapolis metropolitan area